= Malacca College of Complementary Medicine =

College in Melaka, Malaysia

Malacca College of Complementary Medicine (MCCM) is the first college of its kind in Malaysia teaching complementary and natural medicine in the country. The college was founded in Melaka in June 2008.

The college provides course leading to diploma in Natural Medicine. The college is approved by the Ministry of Higher Education, Malaysia and the Malaysian Qualifications Agency (MQA).

The college has an organic farm in Kesang Pajak, Melaka; a complementary medical center in Melaka city; and a naturopathy center in Ayer Keroh, Melaka.
